Alexandreia Airport  is a military airport located near Alexandreia, a city in the regional unit of Imathia in Greece.

Facilities

Nearest airports
The three nearest airports are:

References

External links
 

Airports in Greece
Hellenic Air Force bases
Buildings and structures in Imathia